Hollin Island is an Antarctic island about  long, lying north of Midgley Island, in the Windmill Islands. It was first mapped from air photos taken by USN Operation Highjump in 1946 and 1947. It was named by the US-ACAN for John T. Hollin, glaciologist at Wilkes Station in 1958.

See also
 Composite Antarctic Gazetteer
 List of Antarctic and sub-Antarctic islands
 List of Antarctic islands south of 60° S
 SCAR
 Territorial claims in Antarctica

References

External links 

Windmill Islands